Sasse or Saße may refer to:
Sasse Lake, Elysian Township, Le Sueur County, Minnesota
Student Association at the Stockholm School of Economics

People 
Sasse (musician), Finnish electronic music producer Klas Lindblad
Angela Sasse, German computer scientist
Antoinette Sasse (1897–1986), French artist and member of the French Resistance during World War II
Arthur Sasse (fl. 1951), American photographer most famous for his portrait of Albert Einstein
Ben Sasse (born 1972), American politician from Nebraska
Gwendolyn Sasse, British professor of comparative politics
Hans-Jürgen Sasse (1943–2015), German linguist
Hermann Sasse (1895–1976), German-Australian Lutheran theologian and author
Joshua Sasse (born 1987), British actor
Marie Sasse (1834–1907), Belgian operatic soprano
Ralph Sasse (1889–1954), college football coach from the United States
Yan Sasse (born 1997), Brazilian football midfielder

German-language surnames